James Martinez was a fictional character in the television series NYPD Blue.  He was played by Nicholas Turturro from Seasons 1 to 7.

Biography
Martinez was originally assigned to the 15th Precinct detective squad as a temporary replacement for Andy Sipowicz after Sipowicz was shot.  Though inexperienced, he demonstrated enthusiasm for the job and a willingness to learn, especially from John Kelly, whom he idolized.  He proved a quick study, and his competence and upbeat approach to his job enabled him to earn a permanent assignment as a detective.  He went on to work primarily as the partner of Greg Medavoy.

His family life wasn't always stable; he witnessed the death of his drug addict brother to a drug overdose, for which Martinez's father blamed Martinez.

Martinez pursued fellow Detective Adrienne Lesniak, who sought to avoid his romantic interests by falsely claiming to be a lesbian.  They eventually did begin to date, but Lesniak's constant suspicions and criticism caused James to end their relationship.  In season three, Martinez was shot in the side, bullet fragments lodged near his spine, while responding to a call with Medavoy; though doctors initially feared he'd be paralyzed, Martinez recovered and returned to work.

Gina Colon, a new administrative assistant assigned to the 15th Precinct began a tentative courtship with Martinez.  After Gina was beaten and her face was slashed, Martinez aided in her recovery, and their relationship blossomed.  She became pregnant, but initially rebuffed Martinez's proposals because she didn't want him to feel trapped or obligated.  He eventually convinced her of his sincerity, and they got married shortly before the birth of their son, James Martinez Jr.

The character was written out of the show in Season 7; in the series, Martinez left the 15th Precinct after passing the examination for promotion and receiving a new assignment as a uniformed sergeant.

References

Sources

Internet

Newspapers

Fictional New York City Police Department detectives
NYPD Blue characters
Television characters introduced in 1993